Alexandria Times is a newspaper in Alexandria, Virginia, focusing on news and events in the city of Alexandria itself by covering local news, sports, business, pets, and community. It was started to provide an additional alternative to the current local papers and to include more "hard news" coverage.

Founded in 2005 by John Arundel, the newspaper is a free weekly with both home delivery in seven zip codes and bulk availability in newspaper boxes in 13 zip codes in the City of Alexandria, Arlington County and the Alexandria portion of Fairfax County. It prints around 19,000 copies each week. The co-publisher and executive editor is Denise Dunbar. 

In addition to hard news coverage and feature stories on local artists and other interesting residents, the Times publishes a weekly editorial on a pertinent Alexandria issue, and runs several opinion pages of letters and columns each week. The Times also has a features section called Times Living that runs features on food, pets, seniors and wellness. The paper does special sections on homes and real estate trends and tips, weddings, schools, camps, holiday shopping and more. Beginning in 2007, the Times publishes a weekly feature called "Out of The Attic." It is authored by staff of the Office of Historic Alexandria for both the newspaper and the city's website and features the history of the city, including historic photos.

See also
 Mari Stull

References

External links 
 Alexandria Times website
 Alexandria Times About Us

Newspapers published in Virginia
2005 establishments in Virginia
Newspapers established in 2005
Weekly newspapers published in the United States